Beau Beech (born March 1, 1994) is an American professional basketball player for FMP of the Basketball League of Serbia and the ABA League. He played college basketball for the University of North Florida.

High school career
Beech attended Ponte Vedra High School in Ponte Vedra Beach, Florida. As a senior, he averaged 24 points, 10 rebounds, 3 assists, 2 blocks and 3 steals, leading the Sharks to a district title and regional semifinal appearance while garnering first-team All-State honors.

College career
After graduating high school, Beech joined North Florida where he started in 129 of 133 games while averaging 11.7 points, 5.1 rebounds, 1.4 assists and 1.1 steals in 28.7 minutes per game, all of this while shooting .423 from the field and .393 from three-point range. As a freshman, he was named to the Atlantic Sun All-Freshman Team and as a junior and senior made All-Atlantic Sun First Team. He ended his career first in school history in games played, starts and steals with 147 and tied for first in three-pointers made with 302.

Professional career
After going undrafted in the 2016 NBA draft, Beech joined the Brooklyn Nets for the 2016 NBA Summer League. On August 5, 2016, he signed with the Nets, but was waived on October 18 after appearing in one preseason game. On November 1, he was acquired by the Long Island Nets of the NBA Development League as an affiliate player of the Nets.

On August 23, 2017, Beech was selected by the Erie BayHawks in the NBA G League expansion draft. He was formally signed by the BayHawks on January 18, 2018. In August 2018, Beech signed with the Hamburg Towers of the German Pro A league.

On August 2, 2020, Beech signed with PAOK Thessaloniki of the Greek Basket League. He averaged 6.6 points and 4.5 rebounds per game in 22 games. On July 7, 2021, Beech signed with Czarni Słupsk of the Polish Basketball League.

On July 7, 2022, Beech signed a contract with Serbian team FMP.

Personal life
Beau is the son of Bud and Joanne Beech and has one younger brother, Spencer, and two younger sisters, Olivia and Eve. His father is the head basketball coach and dean of students at Ponte Vedra High. Beech was a 6'6" shooting guard when he began his career at UNF.

References

External links
 North Florida Ospreys bio
 RealGM profile
 Sports-Reference profile

1994 births
Living people
ABA League players
American expatriate basketball people in Germany
American expatriate basketball people in Greece
American expatriate basketball people in Poland
American expatriate basketball people in Serbia
American men's basketball players
Basketball players from Florida
Czarni Słupsk players
Erie BayHawks (2017–2019) players
Hamburg Towers players
KK FMP players
Long Island Nets players
North Florida Ospreys men's basketball players
People from Ponte Vedra Beach, Florida
Shooting guards
Small forwards